Stephen Colletti (born February 7, 1986) is an American actor and television personality. He portrayed Chase Adams on The CW drama series One Tree Hill and appeared for two seasons on the MTV reality television series Laguna Beach: The Real Orange County.

Early life
Colletti was born in Newport Beach, California, the youngest child of Lorilee (née Goodall) and Bruce Colletti.  Colletti has an older brother John, and an older sister Lauren and a brother, Michael. As a teen, Stephen attended Laguna Beach High School in Laguna Beach, California.  He attended San Francisco State University.

Career
In 2004, MTV commissioned a planned reality television series Laguna Beach: The Real Orange County which followed the lives of wealthy teens and Colletti was asked to appear on the show. The series premiered in September 2004. Colletti returned for the second season with the remainder of the cast from the first season. In 2006, the New York Times described his role in the series as "still fighting to acquire some charm to animate his idol looks". Colletti did not return for the show's third season.

Upon graduating high school, he attended San Francisco State University for a year before returning to Los Angeles to pursue an acting career. In 2007 Colletti appeared as himself in an episode of another MTV Reality Television series The Hills. Colletti had a temporary stint as an MTV VJ for MTV's Total Request Live.

In February 2009 Colletti portrayed the role of the love interest in the music video "White Horse" by Taylor Swift.  Swift says that he was selected for the role because "the guy in the video is supposed to look really sweet and someone who just looks like he would never lie to you."

In January 2007, it was announced that Colletti was cast in a major recurring role during the fourth season of The CW teen drama series One Tree Hill. Colletti portrayed the role of Chase Adams, a high school student who plans to save himself until marriage. Over the course of the following seasons Colletti maintained a major recurring role. In November 2010, Colletti was confirmed to have been upgraded as a core series regular for the series eighth season. In May 2011, The CW renewed the series for its ninth and final season, during which Colletti maintained his regular status. The series finale "One Tree Hill" aired on April 4, 2012.

Colletti and fellow One Tree Hill castmate James Lafferty created and worked on the first season of an original comedy called Everyone Is Doing Great. In August 2018 Colletti and Lafferty reached a crowdfunding campaign goal to fund their first season. In the show, Colletti played the role of Seth Stewart, and served as a writer, editor, and producer.  He also directed one episode during the first season.  The series made its debut on Hulu in January of 2021.

Awards and nominations
 2005, nominated for Teen Choice Award for 'Choice TV Reality/Variety Star - Male' for Laguna Beach: The Real Orange County

Filmography

References

External links
 

Male actors from Hollywood, Los Angeles
American male film actors
American male television actors
Living people
21st-century American male actors
San Francisco State University alumni
Participants in American reality television series
People from Laguna Beach, California
VJs (media personalities)
Male actors from Newport Beach, California
1986 births